The 1998 Manila blackmail incident is said to have occurred in Binondo Manila, Philippines when police officers allegedly abducted and blackmailed 7 Chinese citizens suspected of drug trafficking on December 30, 1998. It is said that two Chinese Hong Kong citizens were killed when the ransom money was not met.

Alleged incident
In 1998 two police anti-drug groups, the Presidential Anti-Organized Crime Task Force (PAOCTF) and the PNP Narcotics Group began operation. In the course of its operations seven Chinese people were captured. Three of them were from Hong Kong, Chong Hiu-ming, Wong Kam-chong and Chan Ga-cung.  They were said to be subjects of anti-drug operations and of cooperation between Philippine law enforcement authorities and the Hong Kong Narcotics Bureau. Documents the Inquirer has had since 2008 and Mary Ong, alias Rosebud, say Chong and Wong were detained and abducted for ransom.  Ong also says they were heavily tortured.

It is said that after many months, in March 1999 Chong Hiu-ming's family paid 380,000 yuan and Chong was released. The other two Hong Kong citizens were both killed off in 1999. Specifically, Chan was killed because his wife could not meet the ransom of 50 million peso.

Mary Ong said former Nargroup Superintendent John Campos, who is said to have been her lover, was poised to tell all he knew about the operation when he too was killed in 2002.

Aftermath
The PNP claimed that from July 1998 to June 2000 the PAOCTF reduced kidnapping cases by 29 percent, rescued 94 victims, arrested 73, and prosecuted 125 suspects. It also said 30 kidnapping cases were solved immediately and P11.3 million and $60,000 in ransom money were recovered by the task force nationwide. Panfilo Lacson, the PAOCTF and PNP chief at the time, went on to run for president and was widely preferred by the Filipino-Chinese community. The PAOCTF and PNP Narcotics Group no longer exist.

In 2001 the wives of Chong and Wong asked the Philippine and Chinese government to get the case moving, but it went nowhere due to lack of treaty between the two countries. Hong Kong's sovereignty was returned to China in 1997, a year before the case happened.

References
Notes

Crime in Metro Manila
1998 crimes in the Philippines
1998 in Hong Kong
Blackmail
Hong Kong–Philippines relations